"Nicht verdient" is a song by German rapper Capital Bra and Swiss-Albanian rapper Loredana. It was released on 29 April 2020 as the lead single off Capital Bra's upcoming seventh studio album CB7 through Bra Musik. The song was written by Capital Bra, Loredana and Zuna, while production was handled by Beatzarre, Djorkaeff and BuJaa.

The song debuted at number one in Germany, becoming Capital Bra's 21st and Loredana's fifth number-one-single.

Background and composition
On 15 April 2020, Capital Bra announced the release date of his upcoming album CB7 and revealed that the lead single would feature Loredana. Both artists had previously alluded at a possible collaboration by uploading a clip on the app TikTok doing the "Flip the Switch challenge". During the song, the artists rap over a "Mediterranean instrumental" about people not deserving of their love. Loredana's lyrics were interpreted as a dig at her ex-husband Mozzik.

Music video
The accompanying music video was released on 30 April 2020 and was directed by Heiko Hammer. It features shots of Capital Bra posing in front of a Ferrari, Loredana in front of a dark backdrop dancing on a white dancefloor-like surface, as well as several scenes of both artists rapping together. The video amassed over 1,5 million views in just under 13 hours.

Charts

Weekly charts

Year-end charts

See also
 List of number-one hits of 2020 (Austria)
 List of number-one hits of 2020 (Germany)
 List of number-one hits of 2020 (Switzerland)

References

2020 singles
2020 songs
German-language songs
Loredana Zefi songs
Number-one singles in Austria
Number-one singles in Germany
Number-one singles in Switzerland
Songs written by Loredana Zefi